Eternity is the third album of the Japanese pop rock group Every Little Thing, released on March 15, 2000.

Track listing

Charts 
Album – Oricon Sales Chart (Japan)

Total Sales:  966,710

External links
 Eternity information at Avex Network.
 Eternity information at Oricon.
 Eternity information at Mora.jp (song length)

2000 albums
Every Little Thing (band) albums